Padma Shri Award, India's fourth highest civilian honours - Winners, 1960-1969:

Recipients

References

Explanatory notes

Non-citizen recipients

External links
 
 

Recipients of the Padma Shri
Lists of Indian award winners
1960s in India
1960s-related lists